Karen Melkonyan (born 25 March 1999) is an Armenian footballer who plays as a midfielder for Armenian Premier League club Urartu and the Armenia national team.

Career
A youth academy graduate of Urartu, Melkonyan made his senior team debut on 4 March 2017 in a 1–2 league defeat against Alashkert.

Melkonyan is a former Armenian youth international. On 24 May 2021, he received maiden call-up to senior team for friendlies against Croatia and Sweden. He made his debut on 1 June in a 1–1 draw against Croatia.

Career statistics

International

References

External links
 
Club profile at fcurartu.am

1999 births
Living people
Footballers from Yerevan
Association football midfielders
Armenian footballers
Armenia international footballers
Armenia youth international footballers
Armenia under-21 international footballers
Armenian Premier League players
Armenian First League players
FC Urartu players